Michael Pérez (born August 7, 1992) is a Puerto Rican professional baseball catcher in the New York Mets organization. He has previously played in Major League Baseball (MLB) for the Tampa Bay Rays, Pittsburgh Pirates and New York Mets.

Career 
Pérez attended the Colegio Vocacional Para Adultos in San Juan, Puerto Rico.

Arizona Diamondbacks
The Arizona Diamondbacks selected Pérez in the fifth round of the 2011 Major League Baseball draft. Pérez played for the Diamondbacks organization for eight years, reaching Triple-A.

Tampa Bay Rays
On July 25, 2018, the Diamondbacks traded Pérez and Brian Shaffer to the Tampa Bay Rays for Matt Andriese. With Wilson Ramos injured, the Rays promoted him to the major leagues the same day, and he made his major league debut the next day against the Baltimore Orioles. He got his first hit, a double, off of Alex Cobb that night. On August 31, Perez was placed on the 10-day disabled list with a strained left hamstring and would not play for the remainder of the season. Perez ended the season slashing .284/.304/.392 with one home run and 11 runs batted in. Over the next two seasons, Pérez slashed .185/.277/.269 over 60 games.

Pittsburgh Pirates
On October 30, 2020, the Pittsburgh Pirates claimed Pérez off of waivers. Pérez played in 70 games for Pittsburgh in 2021, hitting just .143/.221/.290 with 7 home runs and 21 RBI. The Pirates designated Pérez for assignment after the season on November 19, 2021. Pérez cleared waivers on November 24, and was assigned outright to the Triple-A Indianapolis Indians.

The Pirates promoted Pérez back to the major leagues on May 7, 2022. He was designated for assignment on July 22, 2022.

New York Mets
Pérez was traded to the New York Mets on July 23, 2022, for cash considerations. He made his Mets debut as a mid-game defensive replacement on August 15, as James McCann moved from catcher to first base. 
Perez collected his first hit as a Met on August 20, a 2-RBI single against the Philadelphia Phillies. He elected free agency on November 10, 2022.

On January 26, 2023, Pérez re-signed with the Mets organization on a minor league contract.

See also 
 List of Major League Baseball players from Puerto Rico

References

External links

1992 births
Living people
People from Cataño, Puerto Rico
Major League Baseball players from Puerto Rico
Major League Baseball catchers
Tampa Bay Rays players
Pittsburgh Pirates players
New York Mets players
Arizona League Diamondbacks players
Gigantes de Carolina players
Missoula Osprey players
Atenienses de Manatí (baseball) players
South Bend Silver Hawks players
Visalia Rawhide players
Senadores de San Juan players
Kane County Cougars players
Mobile BayBears players
Jackson Generals (Southern League) players
Reno Aces players
Salt River Rafters players
Toros del Este players
Puerto Rican expatriate baseball players in the Dominican Republic
Liga de Béisbol Profesional Roberto Clemente catchers
Indianapolis Indians players
Águilas Cibaeñas players